Dehgah-e Kandehi (also Romanized as Dehgāh-e Kandeh’ī; also known as Dehgāh) is a village in Kuhmareh Rural District, Kuhmareh District, Kazerun County, Fars Province, Iran. At the 2006 census, its population was 25, in 4 families.

References 

Populated places in Kazerun County